Urad Rear Banner or Urad Houqi is a banner of the Inner Mongolia Autonomous Region, People's Republic of China. It is located in the prefectural-level municipality of Bayannur city. The capital is moved to the town of Bayinbaolige. This Banner division is also home to the Upper Cretaceous Bayan Mandahu Formation.

Climate

References

External links
 Official website 

Banners of Inner Mongolia
Bayannur